Eucosma parmatana is a species of olethreutine leafroller moth in the family Tortricidae, found in North America.

The MONA or Hodges number for Eucosma parmatana is 2937.

References

Further reading

External links

 

Olethreutinae
Moths described in 1860